Aleksandr Sidoryuk (born 22 February 1977 in Tyumen) is a former Russian football player.

References

1977 births
People from Tyumen
Living people
Russian footballers
FC Tyumen players
Russian Premier League players
FC Dynamo Moscow reserves players
Association football midfielders
Sportspeople from Tyumen Oblast